Maël Gayaud (born 25 March 1992), better known as Alem is a French beatboxer.  In 2015, he was named the fourth Beatbox Battle World Champion in Berlin, after defeating NaPoM of United States in the final.

Before becoming a beatboxer, Alem used to play drums.

In 2008, during the Lyon music festival he met beatboxer 'BMG'. This meeting started his adventure in competing, including the French Championship as well as European and international battles. Alem has also collaborated on several musical projects (Group of Jazz, gospel, Irish, and Breton music) which has allowed him to expand his stage experience. Alem seeks to pass on his passion and experiences.

Career

In 2015, Alem became the first French World Champion in the Men's Solo Category, as well as, Tag Team Champion with beatbox partner, BMG.

In 2018, Alem and female solo Champion, Kaila Mullady, both entered the 5th Beatbox Battle World Championships, marking the first time a World Champion has attempted to defend their title in a consecutive World Championship. Alem was defeated by B-Art in the Top 8 battles.

In 2019, Alem and newly crowned World Champion, Alexinho, formed a tag team and entered into the Grand Beatbox Battle as Uniteam. They went on to win the competition defeating Middle School in the final.

In 2021, Alem secured the 7th spot of the Grand Beatbox Battle solo wildcard, earning him a place in the competition.

Muisical Style
Alem is one of the first pioneer of technicality in modern beatboxing. His style generally involves complex, intricate drum patterns and precise rhythms whilst simultaneously maintaining clarity of sound. He has often cited Kenny Muhammad, the human orchestra, as one of his primary early beatboxing influences.

Achievements

Discography

Albums 
 Bogota Airport (2019)
 Christmas Songs & Beatbox (2020)
 Pause (2021)

References 

Beatboxers
Musicians from Lyon
1992 births
Living people
Beatbox Battle World Champion